Chruślice  is a village in the administrative district of Gmina Wolanów, within Radom County, Masovian Voivodeship, in east-central Poland.

External links
 Jewish Community in Chruślice on Virtual Shtetl

References

Villages in Radom County